Pradeepta Adhikari (born January 25, 1997) is a Nepalese beauty pageant titleholder and debater who was crowned as Miss Nepal Universe 2019. She has previously represented her country in the international debate competitions held in the Netherlands, Singapore, and Thailand.

Life and career

Early life
Pradeepta Adhikari was born and raised in the capital city of Kathmandu. She is a 3rd year medical student currently studying in Nepalese Army Institute of Health Sciences. She was also crowned Miss Nepalese Army Institute of Health Sciences 2018. Her father is a retired Major General. Adhikari speaks 5 different languages.

Pageantry
On 9 May 2019, Adhikari entered the Miss Nepal 2019 pageant as Candidate #10. Adhikari was crowned Miss Nepal Universe, gaining the subtitles of Miss Athletic and Miss Talent. She thus gained the right to subsequently represent Nepal at the Miss Universe 2019 pageant in Atlanta, Georgia but did not place.

References

External links
Missuniverse.com

Living people
1996 births
Miss Nepal winners
Nepalese beauty pageant winners
Miss Universe 2019 contestants
People from Kathmandu